Rugby union in St Lucia is a minor but growing sport. They are currently ranked 80th by the IRB.

Governing body 
The governing body is the St. Lucia Rugby Football Union.

History
Saint Lucia's first ever international rugby match was actually a Round 1a one-off 2007 Rugby World Cup qualifying match, as part of the Americas tournaments in 2005. The match was played against St Vincent & Grenadines, and Saint Lucia won 36 points to 25, which enabled them to advance into the next round of World Cup qualifying.

Women's rugby 
Although St Lucia's women have not yet played test match rugby, they have been playing international sevens rugby since 2005. (Current playing record).

Notable players
Marland Yarde, born in St Lucia played 13 times for the England  scoring 30 points, he has played professionally for London Irish, Harlequins, Sale Sharks and currently Aviron Bayonnais.

See also 
 Saint Lucia national rugby union team

External links
 IRB St Lucia page
 NAWIRA St Lucia page
 Amy Winehouse on holiday in Saint Lucia with ex-rugby player friend
 Saint Lucia on IRB.com
 Saint Lucia on rugbydata.com
 Archives du Rugby: Sainte Lucie
 Development of rugby in St Lucia
 coach rugby in St Lucia

References 

 
Sport in Saint Lucia